Karaikkudi Junction is one of the major passenger rail head and major junction located in Sivaganga district and serving the city of karaikudi.

History 
The station was constructed as a part of Pudukkottai–Sivaganga railway line during the 1930s. Initially during its older days this station acted as an ordinary railway station when the Tiruturaipundi Aranthangi line was extend till karaikudi, it became a junction railway station. It became as a junction by connecting all the three terminal lines they are Manamadurai Sivagangai Railway line, Trichinopoly Pudukkottai Railway line and Tiruturaipundi Aranthangi Railway line. Being a junction station, three rail lines emerge from the station, one towards Tiruchirappalli Junction, another to Thiruthuraipoondi junction and the third and final one Manamadurai Junction.

Overview 
Being a junction station, three rail lines emerge from the station, one towards , another to Manamadurai Junction and the third and final one towards Thiruthuraipoondi Junction. It is one of the two Junctions present in Sivagangai District. One is Manamadurai Junction and the other is Karaikudi Junction.

Administration 
It falls under the operational limits of Madurai railway division of the Southern Railway zone and it is a major as well as an important passing station present on the Tiruchirappalli–Manamadurai railway line.

It also operates an inland container depot (railway goods shed) at Chettinad railway station. Due to lack of land availability and due to the operation of Meter Gauge Goods Terminal at Karaikudi Junction, the railway goods shed is constructed at Chettinad railway station at Kanadukathan which is very near to Karaikudi. But now the Meter Gauge Goods terminal is not in use since all the meter gauge lines were converted into broad gauge lines. But still the meter gauge goods terminal isn't dismantled from the junction.

The Thiruvarur–Karaikudi railway line falls under Tiruchirappalli railway division and all other railway lines fall under Madurai division.

Assistant Divisional Engineer Head Office for North East area of Madurai Division is located at Karaikudi Junction. Whose sub offices were located at Pudukkottai, Sivagangai and Mandapam.

Services 
Karaikudi is well connected with the capital city Chennai. Most of the trains bound to Chennai, Manamadurai, Rameswaram and Kanyakumari from Tiruchirappalli pass through this station, with every train having a stoppage here for a minimum of 5–10 minutes. Few trains namely Ajmer Rameswaram Humsafar Express and Sharddha Sethu Super fast Express skips this Junction. This railway junction act as a source station for Pallavan superfast express, Tiruchirappalli-Karaikudi-Tiruchirappalli DEMU and Tiruvarur-Karaikudi-Tiruvarur DEMU as these train originates and terminates at this Junction.

 BG single line towards  – main line via Aranthangi, Pattukkottai, 
 BG single line towards  via Pudukkottai
 BG single line towards  via Sivaganga

New rail line proposal 
Madurai–Melur–Tirupattur–Karaikudi new BG line: As sanctioned by Railway Board in the year 2007–08, survey was taken & the report was submitted to Railway Board on 29/07/2008. Then updating survey was sanctioned in the year 2013–14 and the survey report was submitted to Railway Board on 27/11/2014. Railway Board has shelved the proposal at present. Decision of Railway Board is awaited.

References 

Madurai railway division
Railway stations in Sivaganga district
Railway stations opened in 1930
Railway junction stations in Tamil Nadu